Lambda Cygni (λ Cyg) is a class B5V (blue main-sequence) star in the constellation Cygnus. Its apparent magnitude is 4.54 and it is approximately 770 light years away based on parallax.

Lambda Cygni is a multiple star, with components A, B, and C observed in the 19th century; the main component, A, is a spectroscopic binary itself with two components Aa and Ab reported at magnitudes 5.4 and 5.8 orbiting with a period of 12 years. Component B has type B7V, magnitude 6.26, and separation 0.77" (about 180 AU based on parallax). Component C has reported type K2III-IV, apparent magnitude 9.65, and separation about 85". Recent observations indicate the presence of additional smaller companions D (about 50" from A), E (about 8" from C), and F (about 40" from C) all around apparent magnitude 14.

References

Cygnus (constellation)
B-type main-sequence stars
Cygni, Lambda
Be stars
102589
7963
198183
Spectroscopic binaries
Cygni, 54
Durchmusterung objects